Laya Francis (born 22 March 1963) is an Indian former cricketer who played as a right-arm medium-fast bowler. She appeared in four Test matches and 11 One Day Internationals for India between 1993 and 1995. She played domestic cricket for Railways.

References

External links
 
 

1963 births
Living people
Cricketers from Mumbai
India women Test cricketers
India women One Day International cricketers
Railways women cricketers